The Ole Miss Rebels softball team represents the University of Mississippi in college softball at the NCAA Division I level. The Rebels are coached by Jamie Trachsel, who will be in her first year as head coach in 2021.

NCAA Regional appearances

NCAA Super Regional appearances

Ole Miss All-Americans

†Denotes 1st Team selection

References

External links